David Jacobs (born 3 May 1989) is a South African cricketer. He made his first-class debut for Easterns in the 2013–14 CSA Provincial Three-Day Competition on 10 October 2013.

References

External links
 

1989 births
Living people
South African cricketers
Easterns cricketers
North West cricketers
Place of birth missing (living people)